Rugby in South Africa:

Rugby union in South Africa
Rugby league in South Africa